{{Album ratings
| rev1 = Blabbermouth.net
| rev1score = 
| rev2 = Metal Hammer
| rev2score = <ref name=Ab>{{cite web |first=Robert |last=Muller |title=We Are The Apocalypse' |url=https://www.metal-hammer.de/reviews/dark-funeral-we-are-the-apocalypse|work=Metal Hammer |accessdate=23 July 2022|archiveurl=https://web.archive.org/web/20220723212740/https://www.metal-hammer.de/reviews/dark-funeral-we-are-the-apocalypse|archivedate=23 July 2022 |url-status=live}}</ref>
| noprose = yes
}}We Are the Apocalypse'' is the seventh studio album by black metal band Dark Funeral. The album was released through Century Media Records on 18 March 2022. The album is the first to feature the band's new drummer, Jalomaah, and bass player, Adra-Melek. The album was recorded in Studio 33 and was engineered by Fredrik Thordendal and Daniel Bergstrand. It peaked at No. 6, No. 13, and No. 28 in the German, Finnish, and Swiss albums charts respectively.

Music videos
The first music video from the album, for the song "Let the Devil In", was released on 7 January 2022. It was created by Polish production company Grupa 13.

The second music video to be released, also created by Grupa 13, was for the song "Leviathan"; it was released on 3 March 2022.

Track listing
All music by Lord Ahriman. All lyrics by Heljarmadr

Personnel

Dark Funeral
 Heljarmadr – vocals
 Lord Ahriman – lead guitar
 Adra-Melek – bass guitar
 Chaq Mol – rhythm guitar
 Jalomaah – drums

Production
 Marcelo Vasco – artwork and layout
 Fredrik Thordendal – engineering
 Daniel Bergstrand – producer, engineering, mixing
 Lord Ahriman – producer
 Hjeldamadr – producer
 Bartosz Szydłowski – photography
 Paul Logus – mastering

Charts

References

2022 albums
Century Media Records albums
Dark Funeral albums